Catahecassa (YTB-827) was a United States Navy .

Construction

The contract for Catahecassa was awarded 5 June 1973. She was laid down on 8 October 1973 at Marinette, Wisconsin, by Marinette Marine and launched 29 May 1974.

Operational history

Catahecassa served as a U.S. Navy Harbor Tug. She was originally assigned to the Naval Weapons Station (NWS), in Concord, California in August 1974.

After the closure of NWS, she was assigned to Naval Station Bremerton, in Bremerton, Washington in the mid to late nineties. She was stricken from the Navy List 27 September 27, 2011.

In 2013, she was sold to Basic Towing and renamed “Gina”.

References

 

Natick-class large harbor tugs
Ships built by Marinette Marine
1974 ships